Anne Maria Kyllönen (born 30 November 1987) is a Finnish cross-country skier. She debuted in the FIS Cross-Country World Cup on 1 December 2007. Kyllönen won the world cup classic team sprint in Sochi in 2013 with Mona-Lisa Malvalehto, and also the classic team sprint in Asiago in 2013 with Aino-Kaisa Saarinen. In the 2016 Tour de Ski, Kyllönen was seventh overall, a personal best.

Cross-country skiing results
All results are sourced from the International Ski Federation (FIS).

Olympic Games
 1 medal – (1 silver)

World Championships

World Cup

Season standings

Individual podiums
9 podiums – (5 , 4 )

Team podiums
2 victories – (2 ) 
7 podiums – (5 , 2 )

References

External links
 
 

1987 births
Finnish female cross-country skiers
Living people
Cross-country skiers at the 2014 Winter Olympics
Cross-country skiers at the 2022 Winter Olympics
Olympic cross-country skiers of Finland
Tour de Ski skiers
Medalists at the 2014 Winter Olympics
Olympic medalists in cross-country skiing
Olympic silver medalists for Finland
People from Kajaani
Sportspeople from Kainuu
21st-century Finnish women